The 2022 Bolat Turlykhanov Cup is a wrestling event was held in Almaty, Kazakhstan between 2 and 5 June 2022. It was held as the second of the ranking series of United World Wrestling.

Competition schedule
All times are (UTC+6)

Medal table

Team ranking

Medal overview

Men's freestyle

Men's Greco-Roman

Women's freestyle

Participating nations 
238 wrestlers from 14 countries:

  (6)
  (1)
  (2)
  (11)
  (27)
  (16)
  (76) (Host)
  (21)
  (24)
  (1)
  (5)
  (9)
  (9)
  (30)

Results

Men's freestyle

Men's freestyle 57 kg
 Legend
 F — Won by fall
{|
|

Men's freestyle 61 kg
 Legend
 F — Won by fall
Elimination groups

Group A

Group B

Knockout round

Men's freestyle 65 kg
 Legend
 F — Won by fall

Men's freestyle 70 kg
 Legend
 F — Won by fall

Men's freestyle 74 kg
 Legend
 F — Won by fall

Men's freestyle 79 kg
 Legend
 F — Won by fall

Men's freestyle 86 kg
 Legend
 F — Won by fall

Men's freestyle 92 kg
 Legend
 F — Won by fall
Elimination groups

Group A

Group B

Knockout round

Men's freestyle 97 kg
 Legend
 F — Won by fall

Men's freestyle 125 kg
 Legend
 F — Won by fall

Men's Greco-Roman

Men's Greco-Roman 55 kg
 Legend
 F — Won by fall
WO — Won by walkover

Men's Greco-Roman 60 kg
 Legend
 F — Won by fall

Men's Greco-Roman 63 kg
 Legend
 F — Won by fall
WO — Won by walkover

Men's Greco-Roman 67 kg
 Legend
 F — Won by fall

Men's Greco-Roman 72 kg
 Legend
 F — Won by fall
Elimination groups

Group A

Group B

Knockout round

Men's Greco-Roman 77 kg
 Legend
 F — Won by fall

Men's Greco-Roman 82 kg
 Legend
 F — Won by fall

Men's Greco-Roman 87 kg
 Legend
 F — Won by fall

Men's Greco-Roman 97 kg
 Legend
 F — Won by fall

Men's Greco-Roman 130 kg
 Legend
 F — Won by fall

Women's freestyle

Women's freestyle 50 kg
 Legend
 F — Won by fall

Women's freestyle 53 kg
 Legend
 F — Won by fall

Women's freestyle 55 kg
 Legend
 F — Won by fall
Elimination groups

Group A

Group B

Knockout round

Women's freestyle 57 kg
 Legend
 F — Won by fall
Elimination groups

Group A

Group B

Knockout round

Women's freestyle 59 kg
 Legend
 F — Won by fall
Elimination groups

Group A

Group B

Knockout round

Women's freestyle 62 kg
 Legend
 F — Won by fall
Elimination groups

Group A

Group B

Knockout round

Women's freestyle 65 kg
 Legend
 F — Won by fall
Elimination groups

Group A

Group B

Knockout round

Women's freestyle 68 kg
 Legend
 F — Won by fall
{|
|

Women's freestyle 72 kg
 Legend
 F — Won by fall
{|
|

Women's freestyle 76 kg
 Legend
 F — Won by fall
Elimination groups

Group A

Group B

Knockout round

Ranking Series
Ranking Series Calendar 2022:
 1st Ranking Series: 24-27 February, Turkey, Istanbul ⇒ 2022 Yasar Dogu Tournament2022 Vehbi Emre & Hamit Kaplan Tournament
 2nd Ranking Series: 2-5 June, Kazakhstan, Almaty ⇒ 2022 Bolat Turlykhanov Cup 
 3rd Ranking Series: 22-25 June, Italy, Rome ⇒ Matteo Pellicone Ranking Series 2022
 4th Ranking Series: 14-17 July, Tunisia, Tunis ⇒ 2022 Tunis Ranking Series

References

External links 
 UWW Database

Bolat Turlykhanov Cup
International wrestling competitions hosted by Kazakhstan
Sports competitions in Almaty
Wrestling in Kazakhstan
Bolat Turlykhanov Cup
Bolat Turlykhanov Cup